The 1974 RAC Castrol Anniversary British Saloon Car Championship was the 17th season of the series. The championship switched to Group 1 regulations in an effort to reduce costs. Bernard Unett won his first title, driving a 1600 cc Hillman Avenger.

Calendar & Winners
All races were held in the United Kingdom. Overall winners in bold.

Championship results

References

External links 
Official website of the British Touring Car Championship

British Touring Car Championship seasons
Saloon